Koren-Benoy (Köran-Bena) is a village (selo) in Kurchaloyevsky District, Chechnya.

Administrative and municipal status 
Municipally, Koren-Benoy is incorporated into Khidi-Khutorskoye rural settlement. It is one of two settlements included in it.

Geography 

Koren-Benoy is located on the left bank of the Gums River.

The nearest settlements to Koren-Benoy are Khidi-Khutor in the north, Belty and Yalkhoy-Mokhk in the north-east, Malye Shuani in the east, Achereshki in the south-east, Enikali in the south, and Regita in the west.

History 
In 1944, after the genocide and deportation of the Chechen and Ingush people and the Chechen-Ingush ASSR was abolished, the village of Koren-Benoy was renamed, and settled by people from the neighbouring republic of Dagestan. From 1944 until 1957, the village was a part of the Shuragatsky District of the Dagestan ASSR.

In 1958, after the Vaynakh people returned and the Chechen-Ingush ASSR was restored, the village regained its old Chechen name, Kuran-Bena.

Population 
 1990 Census: 279
 2002 Census: 149
 2010 Census: 413
 2019 estimate: ?

According to the results of the 2010 Census, the majority of residents of Koren-Benoy were ethnic Chechens.

References 

Rural localities in Kurchaloyevsky District